Taco Tuesday is a custom in many US cities of going out to eat tacos or in some cases select Mexican dishes, typically served in a tortilla on Tuesday nights. Restaurants will often offer special prices, for example, "$1 fish tacos every Tuesday night".

It is popular in many big cities across the nation, and especially popular in the beach cities of Southern California. Taco Tuesday is similar to Happy Hour in that restaurants vary in their participation, hours, and specials offered.

Trademark status 
The Wyoming-based fast food restaurant Taco John's was granted a trademark for "Taco Tuesday" in 1989, and has defended against other restaurants using that phrase.  Taco John's trademark extends to all the United States except New Jersey; in New Jersey, Gregory's Restaurant & Bar of Somers Point trademarked the term in 1982. In 2019, Los Angeles Lakers basketball player LeBron James began sharing social media posts on Instagram about his family's weekly taco dinners dubbed "Taco Tuesdays". Through shell company LBJ Trademarks LLC, he filed a trademark on the term "Taco Tuesday" for use in downloadable audio/visual works, podcasts, social media, online marketing, and entertainment services. The request was denied by the United States Patent and Trademark Office, stating that Taco Tuesday was "a commonplace term, message or expression widely used by a variety of sources that merely conveys an ordinary, familiar, well-recognized concept or sentiment."

In practice, Taco John's has been unable to stop widespread use of the term regardless.  Many taco fans disagree with the idea that any one entity can "own" the term "Taco Tuesdays".

References 

Sales promotion
Restaurant terminology
Taco
Tuesday observances
Trademarks